Jim Manson (died 20 May 2010) was an Australian rules football player and local government politician from Tasmania, Australia.

Manson played 210 games for Glenorchy Football Club, winning the club's best and fairest award in 1964. He played as a ruckman and forward. Manson was a member of the Glenorchy City Council from 1996, and was the council's deputy mayor from 2005 until his death.
His son James played 167 Australian Football League games and was a member of the 1990 Collingwood Football Club team that won the 1990 AFL Grand Final. Jim Manson was inducted into the Tasmanian Football Hall of Fame in 2009. 
Manson was also a television commentator with Hobart television station, TVT6 (later known as Tas-TV and WIN) from the 1970s until the early 1990s, commentating on Tasmanian Football League matches on their World Of Sport program which ended in 1993.

References

2010 deaths
Year of birth missing
Australian rules footballers from Tasmania
Glenorchy Football Club players
Tasmanian Football Hall of Fame inductees
Tasmanian local councillors